Henry Furnese was a British politician.

Henry Furnese may also refer to:

Sir Henry Furnese, 1st Baronet (1658–1712), MP for Bramber and Sandwich
Sir Henry Furnese, 3rd Baronet (c. 1716 – 1735), of the Furnese baronets

See also
Furnese (surname)